The Art of Malice is the fifth solo album by John 5. It was released on May 11, 2010.

Album news 
 On March 2, 2010, the album's first track, entitled "The Nightmare Unravels," was made available for streaming on John 5's official website and MySpace page.  The cover for the album was also revealed. The artwork and photography was done by Ray Gutierrez of Strangebeautifulart.com.

Track listing

Credits 
 John 5 – lead guitars, banjo, bass
 Tommy Clufetos – drums
 Greg 'Plushie' Hanna – additional bass ("J.W." and "Steel Guitar Rag".)

References 

John 5 (guitarist) albums
2010 albums
Instrumental albums